Coptotriche rosella is a moth of the family Tischeriidae. It is found in Turkmenistan, Uzbekistan and Tajikistan.

The larvae feed on Rosa species. They probably mine the leaves of their host plant.

References

Moths described in 1937
Tischeriidae